Badagoan is a town and a nagar panchayat in Shajapur district in the state of Madhya Pradesh, India.

Demographics
 India census, Badagoan had a population of 6,566. Males constitute 52% of the population and females 48%. Badagoan has an  literacy rate of 52%, lower  than the national average of 59.5%; with 59% of the males and 31% of females literate. 17% of the population is under 6 years of age.

References

Cities and towns in Shajapur district
Shajapur